Elaine Grace White (born 9 July 1944) is a New Zealand former cricketer who played as an all-rounder, batting right-handed and bowling right-arm medium. She appeared in three Test matches for New Zealand in 1972. She played domestic cricket for Auckland and North Shore.

References

External links

1944 births
Living people
Cricketers from Auckland
New Zealand women cricketers
New Zealand women Test cricketers
Auckland Hearts cricketers
North Shore women cricketers